Bagatur or Bater (born February 1955) is a Chinese politician of Mongol ancestry, formerly serving as the Chairman of the State Ethnic Affairs Commission. A career party functionary with background in the Communist Youth League, Bagatur steadily ascended the ranks of government, spending his entire career in Inner Mongolia. Between 2009 and 2016, he served as Chairman of Inner Mongolia. 

As the Chairman of the State Ethnic Affairs Commission from 2016 to 2020, he was responsible for the  relations between the Central Government and the other 55 ethnic minorities in China (such as Uyghurs, Tibetans etc.).

Biography
Bagatur, an ethnic Mongol, was born in Kangping County in northeastern Liaoning Province in February 1955. He obtained a diploma in Mongolian language from Hailar Mongolian Normal College. He began work in January 1973 in Ulan Muqir in the Evenk Autonomous Banner under Hulunbuir city, Heilongjiang Province. He joined the CPC in December 1981 and went to serve in Inner Mongolia, ultimately becoming secretary of the Inner Mongolia Autonomous Regional Committee of the Communist Youth League of China between April 1986 and April 1992.

Bagatur served as the secretary of the CPC Wuhai Municipal Committee from March 1994 to December 1999 and also mayor of Wuhai from December 1994 to February 1998. During this time, he obtained a master's degree in political economics from Fudan University. He was the Secretary of the Inner Mongolia Autonomous Region's party Discipline Inspection Commission from December 1999 to April 2008, and beginning in December 2001 was named deputy secretary of the CPC Inner Mongolia Autonomous Regional Committee. Bagatur was appointed acting chairman and vice chairman of the regional government on April 3, 2008. He was elected chairman on January 12, 2009.

Bagatur was an alternate member of the 15th Central Committee. He was a member of the 16th and 17th Central Commissions of Discipline Inspection. On December 27, 2008, Bagatur was admitted as a substitute delegate to the 11th National People's Congress (NPC) representing Inner Mongolia.  In November 2012, he was elected to the 18th Central Committee of the Communist Party of China. In March 2016, Bagatur was transferred to become the Chairman of the State Ethnic Affairs Commission.

References

External links 
  Biography of Bagatur, Xinhua.
  Acting Chairman Bagatur participates in an online chat at Xinhuanet.com (July 14, 2008).

1955 births
Living people
Politicians from Shenyang
People's Republic of China politicians from Liaoning
Political office-holders in Inner Mongolia
Chinese people of Mongolian descent
Vice Chairpersons of the National Committee of the Chinese People's Political Consultative Conference
Chinese Communist Party politicians from Liaoning
Members of the 20th Central Committee of the Chinese Communist Party